Sir Moyle Finch, 1st Baronet JP ( – 18 December 1614) was an English politician, knight, sheriff, and MP.

Early life
Finch was second, but eldest surviving son, of Sir Thomas Finch of Eastwell, Kent, and the former Catherine Moyle. Among his siblings was brother Henry Finch (MP for Canterbury and St Albans), and sister Jane Finch (who married George Wyatt of Allington Castle).

His paternal grandparents were Sir William Finch, who was knighted for his services at the siege of Therouanne, and, his first wife, Elizabeth ( Cromer) Lovelace (a daughter of Sir James Cromer of Tunstall, Kent, and widow of Sir Richard Lovelace). His maternal grandparents were Sir Thomas Moyle and the former Katherine Jordeyne (a daughters of Edward Jordeyne, a leading goldsmith at Cheapside with a manor at Raynham).

Finch was admitted of Gray's Inn in 1568.

Career
Finch first entered Parliament at a by-election for  Weymouth and Melcombe Regis, through the influence of the 2nd Earl of Bedford, who had campaigned with his father at St. Quentin in 1557 (during the  Italian War), sitting between 1576 and 1584. He later represented Kent in 1593 (the same year he was elected knight of the shire for Kent) and for Winchelsea in 1601. He served as High Sheriff of Kent in 1596 and 1605. 

He was knighted in 1585 and he was created a Baronet, of Eastwell in the County of Kent, in 1611.

Personal life
In 1573, Finch married Elizabeth Heneage, daughter and heiress of Sir Thomas Heneage. They had a daughter Anne who was a writer: she married Sir William Twysden, 1st Baronet.

 Sir Theophilius Finch, 2nd Baronet (1573–1619), who married Agnes Heydon, only child of Sir Christopher Heydon of Baconsthorpe.
 Lady Anne Finch (1574–1638), who married Sir William Twysden, 1st Baronet.
 Heneage Finch (b. 1576), who died young.
 Thomas Finch, 2nd Earl of Winchilsea (1578–1639), who married Cicely Wentworth, daughter of John Wentworth, MP.
 Hon. Sir Heneage Finch (1580–1631), Speaker of the House of Commons who married Frances Bell, a daughter of Sir Edmond Bell of Beaupre Hall. After her death, he married Elizabeth (née Cradock) Bennett, a daughter of William Cradock and the widow of Richard Bennett.
 Hon. Francis Finch (b. ), a barrister and MP for Eye.
 Lady Catherine Finch, who married Sir John Wentworth, 1st Baronet, of Gosfield.

He died in December 1614 and was succeeded by his eldest son, Theophilus. Lady Finch was elevated to the peerage in her own right as Viscountess Winchilsea in 1623 and was further honoured when she was made Countess of Winchilsea in 1628. She died in 1634 and was succeeded by her third son, Thomas, who had already succeeded his elder brother in the baronetcy. Their fourth son Sir Heneage Finch became Speaker of the House of Commons and was the father of Heneage Finch, 1st Earl of Nottingham.

References

1550s births
1614 deaths
17th-century English nobility
Baronets in the Baronetage of England
Moyle
High Sheriffs of Kent
Knights Bachelor
English knights
English MPs 1572–1583
English MPs 1584–1585
English MPs 1593
English MPs 1601
English justices of the peace
Moyle